The title Hero of the Soviet Union was the highest distinction of the Soviet Union. It was awarded 12,775 times. Due to the large size of the list, it has been broken up into multiple pages.

 Yelena Ubiyvovk
 Vasily Uvarov ru
 Aleksey Uvatov ru
 Innokenty Uvachan ru
 Semyon Uganin ru
 Mikhail Ugarov ru
 Anatoly Uglovsky ru
 Mikhail Uglovsky ru
 Fyodor Ugnachyov ru
 Nikolai Ugryumov ru
 Spartak Ugryumov ru
 Vasily Udalov ru
 Ivan Udalov ru
 Yefim Udaltsov ru
 Nikolai Udarov ru
 Grigory Udartsev ru
 Vasily Udachin ru
 Stepan Udov ru
 Aleksandr Udovichenko ru
 Ivan Udovichenko ru
 Ivan Udod ru
 Aleksandr Udodov ru
 Ablakul Uzakov ru
 Vladimir Uzu ru
 Kirill Ukleba ru
 Mikhail Ukolov ru
 Ivan Ukradyshenko ru
 Dmity Ulanin ru
 Ilya Ulanov ru
 Nikolai Ulanovsky ru
 Aleksandr Ulasovets ru
 Ivan Ulitin ru
 Nikolai Ulitin ru
 Pavel Ulitsky ru
 Ivan Ulybin ru
 Walter Ulbricht
 Nina Ulyanenko
 Fyodor Ulyanin ru
 Vitaly Ulyanov ru
 Georgy Ulyanov ru
 Ivan Mikhailovich Ulyanov ru
 Ivan Fedoseevich Ulyanov ru
 Sergey Ulyanov ru
 Georgy Ulyanovsky ru
 Terenty Umansky ru
 Fyodor Umansky ru
 Salikh Umarov ru
 Shadman Umarov ru
 Abdulkhak Umerkin ru
 Mukhazhir Ummaev ru
 Andrey Umnikov ru
 Mukhitdin Umurdinov ru
 Aleksey Unzhakov ru
 Ilyas Urazov ru
 Chutak Urazov ru
 Yesen Urakbaev ru
 Bronislav Urbanavichus ru
 Yakov Urvantsev ru
 Idrus Urgenishbaev ru
 Konstantin Urzhunstev ru
 Vladimir Urzlya ru
 Vitaly Urukov ru
 Noy Urushadze ru
 Pavel Uryupin ru
 Viktor Us ru
 Ivan Us ru
 Ilya Usanin ru
 Valentin Usanov ru
 Konstantin Usanov ru
 Grigory Usaty ru
 Ivan Usatyuk ru
 Mikhail Usachyov ru
 Filipp Usachyov ru
 Kalynur Usenbekov ru
 Yevgeny Usenko ru
 Ivan Arkhipovich Usenko ru
 Ivan Romanovich Usenko ru
 Konstantin Usenko ru
 Leonty Usenko ru
 Nikolai Vitalevich Usenko ru
 Nikolai Ilyich Usenko
 Abdulla Usenov ru
 Ivan Usik ru
 Moisey Usik ru
 Ivan Usilov ru
 Vasily Uskov ru
 Dzhurakhan Usmanov ru
 Islam Usmanov ru
 Viktor Usov ru
 Vladimir Usov ru
 Nikifor Usov ru
 Pavel Usov ru
 Stepan Ustimenko ru
 Aleksandr Ustinov ru
 Dmitry Ustinov
 Ivan Makarovich Ustinov ru
 Ivan Timofeevich Ustinov ru
 Semyon Ustinov ru
 Stepan Ustinov ru
 Yakov Ustyuzhanin ru
 Yegor Utev ru
 Aleksandr Utin ru
 Andrey Utin ru
 Vasily Utin ru
 Valery Utkin ru
 Yevgeny Dmitrievich Utkin ru
 Yevgeny Ivanovich Utkin ru
 Ilya Ilyich Utkin ru
 Ilya Nikiforovich Utkin ru
 Zubai Utyagulov 
 Konstantin Ufimtsev ru
 Sergey Ufimtsev ru
 Valery Ukhabov ru
 Ilya Ukho ru
 Aleksandr Ushakov ru
 Vasily Ushakov ru
 Viktor Ushakov ru
 Dmitry Ushakov ru
 Mikhail Ushakov ru
 Nikolai Ushakov ru
 Pyotr Ushakov ru
 Sergey Ushakov ru
 Stepan Ushakov ru
 Sergey Ushanev ru
 Dmitry Ushkov ru
 Grigory Ushpolis ru
 Boris Ushchev ru

References 

 
 Russian Ministry of Defence Database «Подвиг Народа в Великой Отечественной войне 1941—1945 гг.» [Feat of the People in the Great Patriotic War 1941-1945] (in Russian).

Lists of Heroes of the Soviet Union